The Light-Bearer's Daughter is a fantasy novel by O.R. Melling. It was published on March 1, 2001, and is the third book in the Chronicles of Faerie series, the first being The Hunter's Moon, the second being The Summer King, and the fourth and final being The Book of Dreams.

Plot
In this book, a young girl named Dana from Ireland runs away from home when her father informs her that they are moving to Canada. Her mother disappeared when Dana was small. Dana begins to discover more about the world of Faerie and learns the reasons behind her mother's disappearance.

References 

 Kirkus reviews

Chronicles of Faerie series
2001 Canadian novels
2001 fantasy novels